Serra d'El-Rei ('Mountains of the King') is a Portuguese parish in the municipality of Peniche on the Atlantic Coast. The population in 2011 was 1,401, in an area of 8.92 km². Serra d'El-Rei became a town on July 1, 2003.

It was at Serra d'El-Rei that King Peter I of Portugal lived with his lover Inês de Castro. His 14th-century castle in the town is now divided into three private living houses today.

Gallery

References

External links
Serra d'El-Rei official website

Freguesias of Peniche, Portugal
Towns in Portugal